In 1930 the "Association Française des Professeurs de Tennis (AFPT)" held its first pro tournament, entitled "Championnat International de France Professionnel" (French Pro Championships) on June 18–22, 1930.

From 1930 the French Pro Championship were always played at Paris, on outdoor clay at Roland Garros except from 1963 to 1967 where it was held at Stade Pierre de Coubertin on indoor wood.

1930

1931

1932

1934

1935

1936

1937

1938

1939

1956

1958

Seeding: source

1959

1960

1961

1962

1963

1964

1965

1966

1967

See also
 U.S. Pro Tennis Championships draws, 1927–1945
 U.S. Pro Tennis Championships draws, 1946–1967
 Wembley Professional Championships draws

References

External links
French Pro Championships at Grand Slam Tennis Archive

Tennis tournaments in France
Professional tennis tournaments before the Open Era